Charar-i-Sharief (variously spelled Chrar-e-Sharif, Charari Shareef, etc.) (known as Tsrar-i-Sharif in Kashmiri, is a town and a notified area committee in the Budgam district of the union territory of Jammu and Kashmir, India.

The town was given the status of block in January 2014. The town is divided into 10 wards. Each ward has a municipal councillor.

The famous mohallas of Charar-i-Sharief are: Talab-e-Kalan or Bada Talab, Trajibal, Court Road, Gulshanabad, Nowhar, Baghi Noor U Din Nowhar,  Jabl-e-Noor, Wazabagh, Alamdar colony, Zaloosa and Kumar Mohalla.

Charar-i-Sharief is considered one of the most sacrosanct Muslim shrines in Kashmir. The Shrine of Charar-i-Sharief is approximately 600 years old. It is popularly known as the "Sheikh Noor-ud-Din Wali". Mr. Ahmadullah Wani and Mr. Haji Abdul Rashid Wani were the most famous personalities in the town, they were prominent landlords who owned huge areas of farmland in the town of Charari Sharief.

Geography
Charari Sharief has an average elevation of 1,933 metres (6,345 feet) above mean sea level.

Demographics
 India census, Charar i Sharief had a population of 15,000. Males constitute 53% of the population and females 47%. Charar i Sharief has an average literacy rate of 59%, lower than the national average of 59.5%; with male literacy of 58% and female literacy of 38%. 12% of the population is under 6 years of age.

Municipal committee
Municipal Committee Charar-E-Sharief is an Urban Local Body which administrates the town of Charar-E-Sharief in Budgam district, Jammu and Kashmir, India. It has 13 elected members. Its last elections took place on 10 October 2018.

 Keys:

See also
Charar-e-Sharief Shrine

References

External links
 Holy Places (Budgam District official website)

Cities and towns in Budgam district